Gordon Christie  (27 August 1914 – 13 June 2001) was a New Zealand politician of the Labour Party.

Biography

Early life and career
Christie was born on 27 August 1914. He received his education at Nelson Park School and Napier Technical College. He was on the executive of the North Island Waterfront Association for six years, and president of the Napier Watersiders Union for ten years from 1957 to 1967. He was a member of the Napier Port Conciliation Committee, and vice-chairman of the Napier Port Safety Committee.

Member of Parliament

Both Christie and Braybrooke were described as Labour "stalwarts who effectively held the electorate in a tight grip".

During his time in parliament Christie was noted as a reliable and hard-working constituency member. Warren Freer described him as a solid and dependable MP who was a consistent and practical advocator for his constituents needing assistance as well as being a most conscientious select committee member. He would constantly raise issues in caucus when policies would adversely affect the least fortunate in society. During the Third Labour Government (1972-5), together with  MP Joe Walding, he coined the phrase "if it adversely effects them, it's bad policy". After the surprise defeat of the Third Labour Government in 1975, Labour leader Bill Rowling designated Christie Shadow Minister of Police.

Later life and death
In 1977, Christie was awarded the Queen Elizabeth II Silver Jubilee Medal. He was appointed a Member of the Order of the British Empire in the 1985 New Year Honours, for public and community service. In 1990, he was awarded the New Zealand 1990 Commemoration Medal.

Christie died at Taupo on 13 June 2001. He was predeceased by his wife Betty (née Bowers) (1924–1997), with whom he had three children.

Notes

References
 

1914 births
2001 deaths
New Zealand Members of the Order of the British Empire
New Zealand Labour Party MPs
New Zealand MPs for North Island electorates
Members of the New Zealand House of Representatives
20th-century New Zealand politicians
New Zealand justices of the peace
New Zealand trade unionists